The Battle of Gwalior took place between Jat ruler of Gohad and Mughal Governor Ali Khan. After the death of Aurangzeb, the Mughal Empire goes week and Maharaja Bhim Singh Rana attacked on Gwalior and captured it from Mughals.

Background
After the death of the Mughal emperor Aurangzeb, the Mughal Empire began to decline economically and militarily. The Jats were among a number of groups who sought to fill this power vacuum. In 1740, Bhim Singh Rana marched on Gwalior Fort. The Mughal satrap Ali Khan surrendered the fortress to the Jat forces.

Battle
In 1740, Bhim Singh Rana the Jat ruler of gohad decided to take gwalior fort from mughal governor Ali Khan. He attacked on gwalior but marathas also want to take gwalior. Ali Khan Surrender gwalior fort to Jats and there are several battle fought between Jats and marathas for gwalior. But Jats win and gwalior came under Jats. Bhim Singh Rana occupied from 1740 to 1756.

Aftermath

The battle marked the end of Mughal rule in Gwalior. In 1756, the Marathas took eventual control of Gwalior.

See also
Gohad State

References

External links
Bhim Singh at History Files

Battles involving the Jats